Social–liberal coalition in the politics of Germany refers to a governmental coalition formed by the Social Democratic Party of Germany (SPD) and the Free Democratic Party (FDP).

The term stems from social democracy of the SPD and the liberalism of the FDP. Because of the colours traditionally used to symbolise the two parties (red for SPD and yellow for FDP), such a coalition is also referred to as a "red–yellow" coalition (rot–gelbe Koalition). The FDP is basically an economic/classical liberal party, but under the coalition, the FDP and the SPD are close to left-liberalism (Linksliberalismus).

Social–liberal coalitions are currently rare, as the SPD usually governs with the Alliance '90/The Greens and the FDP orients itself towards long-term co-operation with the Christian Democratic Union and Bavarian Christian Social Union. However, a social–liberal coalition ruled from 1991 to 2006 in the German State of Rhineland-Palatinate and would have continued to do so, had the SPD not won an absolute majority. Social–liberal coalitions have previously been in power in many other federal states of Germany as well.

From 1969 to 1982 social–liberal coalitions led by  Federal Chancellors Willy Brandt and Helmut Schmidt governed the Federal Republic of Germany.

The traffic light coalition is a combination of the social-liberal coalition and the red-green coalition insofar as it includes the Social Democratic Party, the FDP and the greens, which are the constituent elements of the other two coalitions. The Weimar Coalition was a similar constellation of parties as it included the Social Democratic Party as well as a left-liberal party (the then German Democratic Party one of the predecessors of the FDP) and the liberal-conservative/conservative-liberal element also present in the FDP with the Zentrumspartei. However, the political Catholicism espoused by the Zentrum is absent in the postwar social-liberal coalition.

Social–liberal coalitions at the federal state level 

After the term, the leader of the government is given.

Berlin 
 1963–66 Willy Brandt (despite having an absolute majority)
 1966–67 Heinrich Albertz (despite having an absolute majority)
 1967–71 Klaus Schütz (despite having an absolute majority)
 1975–77 Klaus Schütz
 1977–81 Dietrich Stobbe
 1981 Hans-Jochen Vogel

Bremen 
 1959–65 Wilhelm Kaisen
 1967–71 Hans Koschnick

Hamburg 
 1957–61 Max Brauer
 1961–65 Paul Nevermann
 1965–66 Herbert Weichmann
 1970–71 Herbert Weichmann
 1971–74 Peter Schulz
 1974–78 Hans-Ulrich Klose
 1987–88 Klaus von Dohnanyi
 1988–91 Henning Voscherau

Hesse 
 1970–76 Albert Osswald
 1976–82 Holger Börner

Lower Saxony 
 1963–65 Georg Diederichs
 1974–76 Alfred Kubel

North Rhine-Westphalia 
 1956–58 Fritz Steinhoff
 1966–78 Heinz Kühn
 1978–80 Johannes Rau

Rhineland-Palatinate 
 1991–94 Rudolf Scharping
 1994–2006 Kurt Beck

See also
German governing coalition
Grand coalition (Germany)
Traffic light coalition
Jamaica coalition
Red–green alliance
Lib–Lab pact for the equivalent in British politics
Purple (government)

Social liberalism
Social Democratic Party of Germany
Free Democratic Party (Germany)